Avatiu FC is a Cook Islands football club located in Avatiu, Cook Islands. It currently plays in Cook Islands Round Cup the main football league competition. They have won six championships and nine Cook Islands Cups, more than any other team.

Titles
Cook Islands Round Cup: 6
1980, 1991, 1994, 1996, 1997, 1999

Cook Islands Cup: 9
1981, 1982, 1992, 1993, 1994, 1995, 1996, 1997, 2000

Current squad
Squad for the 2021

References

Football clubs in the Cook Islands